Creugas gulosus is a species of true spider in the family Corinnidae. It is found in Southern America, has been introduced into Africa, Myanmar, Australia, and Pacific islands.

References

Corinnidae
Articles created by Qbugbot
Spiders described in 1878